Velká Losenice is a municipality and village in Žďár nad Sázavou District in the Vysočina Region of the Czech Republic. It has about 1,200 inhabitants.

Administrative parts
The village of Pořežín is an administrative part of Velká Losenice.

References

External links

 

Villages in Žďár nad Sázavou District